Herman is the name of some places in the U.S. state of Wisconsin:
Herman, Dodge County, Wisconsin, a town
Herman, Shawano County, Wisconsin, a town
Herman, Sheboygan County, Wisconsin, a town
Herman Center, Wisconsin, an unincorporated community